Creatures is the debut studio album by American metalcore band Motionless in White. It was released on October 12, 2010, through Fearless Records and was produced by Andrew Wade. The album produced four singles: "Abigail", "Immaculate Misconception", the title track "Creatures" and "Puppets (The First Snow)", all four of which have accompanying music videos. The album also produced three promotional singles: "Abigail", which was later released as the first official single of the album, "London in Terror", and "Cobwebs". The title "creatures" is also commonly used to refer to the fans of the band.

On October 9, 2020, Motionless in White released a 10th anniversary re-issue of the album titled Creatures X.

Background and recording
Creatures is an album dedicated to Motionless in White's fans. The band even went as far as letting their fans send in lyrics, which were compiled on the title track; all the lines found in the song (excluding the chorus) are lyrics submitted by fans. The songs "We Only Come Out at Night" and "City Lights" are re-recorded and altered versions of songs from the album version of When Love Met Destruction. Creatures was recorded during May 2010 with producer Andrew Wade at his recording studio, Wade Studios.

Release and promotion
A total of four songs from the album have had music videos. On December 21, 2010, a music video was released for the track "Abigail". The music video for the track "Creatures" was released on July 7, 2011, and the video for "Immaculate Misconception" surfaced on November 11, 2011, which also features Dee Snider, who makes a cameo appearance while his son, Cody, directed the video.

It was announced on the 2011 All Stars Tour that the song "Puppets (The First Snow)" would also be released as a single, but the music video would not be released until February 15, 2012. The video consists of the band performing at several concerts and festivals. The outdoor clips shown in the video were recorded at a live performance during the All Stars Tour's stop in Las Vegas on August 21, 2011.

A re-release for the album was confirmed during January 2012. It was announced to feature their cover of the song "Dragula" by Rob Zombie along with two remixed songs, and was released on April 2, 2012.

Critical reception

The album received positive reviews from music critics. AllMusic gave the album a positive review but saying, "In a genre with a laundry list of cookie-cutter bands all fighting to grab the attention of a young audience, sometimes distinguishing yourself is a matter of degrees. On their debut full-length, Motionless in White attempt to do just that. Delivering a heavy-hitting dose of horror themed metalcore, Creatures finds the band exploring a more gothic sound. With lots of breakdowns, reverse drum swells, good cop/bad cop vocals, and bass bombs, there's a lot about the album that feels pretty much by the book. Where Motionless in White are able to make it interesting is in the use of their electronic elements. Rather than going for the usual dance-pop sound, the band uses their synthesizers to create a dark and uneasy atmosphere. This blend of the frightening and the familiar gives Creatures not only the ability to draw fans in with something they'll immediately click with, but which will keep them coming back for another helping."

Rock Sound gave it 7 out of 10 and said: "While Pennsylvania's Motionless In White push past the boundaries of screamo into more metallic territories, their intermittently screamed and harmonised vocals, epic choruses and brutal breakdowns keep them firmly in touch with their roots. Thematically, there's a venom spat out in opener 'Immaculate Misconception' that's maintained – lyrical allusions in frontman Chris Motionless' interpretations of history and literature or parallels with his musical heroes (listen out for The Smiths reference in 'Puppets (The First Snow)') keep things good and dark throughout. At times, the dramatic crosses over into the theatrical, but even then it's good to see an of-the-moment band taking things seriously."

Commercial performance
Upon the record's release, it debuted at #6 on the Billboard Heatseeker Chart, and reached #175 on the Billboard 200.

Track listing
All music composed by Motionless in White, all lyrics written by Chris Motionless except for "Creatures" written by Chris Motionless and fans of the band.

Personnel

Motionless in White
 Chris "Motionless" Cerulli – lead vocals
 Ryan Sitkowski – lead guitar
 Thomas "TJ" Bell – rhythm guitar, co-lead vocals
 Ricky "Horror" Olson – bass, backing vocals
 Josh Balz – keyboards, backing vocals
 Angelo Parente – drums

Additional musicians
 Nick Brooks of It Dies Today – additional vocals on "Abigail"
 Andre Bravo of In Alcatraz 1962 – additional vocals on "Cobwebs"

Additional personnel
 Andrew Wade – production, mixing, engineering
 Alan Douches – mastering
 Glenn Sawyer – production, keyboard engineering
 Joe La Barbera – vocal engineering, vocal production
 Jason Valenti – vocal engineering, vocal production
 Val Valentin – vocal engineering, vocal production
 Shervon Esfahani – A&R
 Devin Timmons – management
 Matt Pike – booking
 Sol Amstutz – illustrations, design

Charts

References

Fearless Records albums
2010 debut albums
Motionless in White albums
Albums produced by Andrew Wade